Flare is the Japanese pop singer Hitomi Shimatani's seventh studio album. It is available in both CD and CD+DVD format.

CD track listing
 Heavenly
 Start
 雨の日には　雨の中を　風の日には　風の中を (Ame no Hi ni wa Ame no Naka wo Kaze no Hi ni wa Kaze no Naka wo; In the Rain When It's Raining, In the Wind When It's Windy)
 Dita
 深紅 (Shinku; Deep Crimson)
 泣きたいなら (Nakitai Nara; If I Want To Cry)
 Dear...
 太陽のFlare (Taiyou no Flare; Sun's Flare)
 Wake You Up
 Shake It Up!
 Neva Eva
 Marvelous
 愛の詩＜Strings version＞ (Ai no Uta; Poem of Love) (CD only bonus track)

DVD track list
 Neva Eva (PV)
 Shinku (深紅) (PV)
 Nakitai Nara (泣きたいなら) (PV)
 Ame no Hi ni wa Ame no Naka wo Kaze no Hi ni wa Kaze no Naka wo (雨の日には　雨の中を　風の日には　風の中を) (PV)
 Wake You Up (1 Chorus) (PV)
 Marvelous (1 chorus) (PV)

Bonus contents (live footage)
 Papillon: Papillon (パピヨン: Papillon) (from 由比ガ浜ライヴ '07)
 Ame no Hi ni wa Ame no Naka wo Kaze no Hi ni wa Kaze no Naka wo (雨の日には　雨の中を　風の日には　風の中を)

Charts

References

Hitomi Shimatani albums
2008 albums